Boni may refer to:

Places
 Bone state, a vassal state of the government of Celebes, Dutch East Indies
 Boni MRT Station, a train station in Manila, Philippines
 Boni, Benin, an arrondissement in the Collines department of Benin state
 Boni (department), a department or commune of Tuy Province in Burkina Faso
 Boni National Reserve, Garissa County, Kenya
 Boni, an old name for a state on the island of Borneo, possibly Brunei

Iran
 Boni, Ramhormoz, a village in Howmeh-ye Gharbi Rural District
 Now Boni, a village in Ganjabad Rural District
 Seh Boni, a village in Jolgeh-ye Chah Hashem Rural District
 Shahrak-e Shahid Mohasan Boni Najar, a village in Kiyaras Rural District

Mali
 Boni, Korarou, a village and seat of the commune of Korarou
 Boni, Mali, a village

Other uses
 Aluku people, also known as Boni, French Guiana
 Aweer people, also known as Boni, Kenya
 Boni (Kenyan language), a language of the Aweer
 Boni (film), a 2009 Telugu film
 Boni Homines, an appellative of at least three religious orders in the Catholic Church
 Boni, a character in the television series The Trap Door
 The boni ("good men") political faction of the late Roman Republic, also called the Optimates
 Nazi Boni University, one of three public universities in Burkina Faso
 Rendille–Boni languages, proposed subgroup of the Macro-Somali languages, belonging to the Cushitic family

People with the given name 
 Boni (c. 1730–1793), Maroon guerilla leader in Suriname
 Boni Boyer (1958–1996), American vocalist, multi-instrumentalist and composer
 Boni David (born 1978), Papua New Guinean woman cricketer
 Boni Haruna (born 1957), Nigerian Minister for Youth Development
 Boni Petcoff (1900–1965), American football tackle and coach

People with the surname 
 Ahmed bin Ali Al-boni (died 1225), Arab mathematician, Sufi and writer on esotericism 
 Akwa Boni (died 1790), sovereign Queen of the Baoulé people
 Albert Boni (1892–1981), co-founder of the publishing company Boni & Liveright
 Aldo Boni (1894–1982), Italian fencer
 Alessio Boni (born 1966), Italian actor
 Bernardino Boni (died 1774), Italian painter of the late-Baroque period
 Bruno Boni (1915–2003), Italian Olympic rower
 Carla Boni (1925–2009), Italian singer
 Carmen Boni (1901–1963), Italian actress
 Danièle Boni-Claverie (born 1942), Ivorian journalist and politician 
 Giacomo Boni one of the following
 Giacomo Boni (archaeologist) (1859–1925), specialist in Roman architecture
 Giacomo Boni (painter) (1688–1766), Baroque painter
 Guido Boni (1892–1956), Italian gymnast
 Guido Boni (cyclist) (1933–2014), Italian racing cyclist
 Jim Boni (born 1963), Italian-Canadian ice hockey coach
 Loris Boni (born 1953), Italian professional football coach and a former player
 Luisella Boni (born 1935), Italian actress
 Marco Boni (pole vaulter) (born 1984), Italian pole vaulter
 Maria Roza Boni (born 1986), Greek professional basketball player
 Mario Boni (born 1963), Italian former professional basketball player
 Michele Giovanni Boni (or Michele Giambono; 1400–1462), Italian painter
 Nazi Boni (1909–1969), politician from Upper Volta (now Burkina Faso)
 Michał Boni (born 1954), Polish politician, Minister of Labour and Social Policy in 1991
 Napoleone Boni (1863–1927), Italian painter
 Roméo Boni (born 1990), Burkinabé international footballer 
 Tanella Boni (born 1954), Ivorian poet and novelist
 Tommaso Boni (born 1993), Italian rugby union player
 Trova Boni (born 1999), Burkinabé footballer
 Valentina Boni (born 1983), Italian football midfielder 
 Victoria Boni (1839–1909), Swedish opera singer

See also 
 Bonis (disambiguation)
 Bonny (disambiguation)
 Bono (disambiguation)
 Bonus (disambiguation)